Pandu Ranga Vittala is a 2005 Indian Kannada-language romantic comedy film,  directed by Dinesh Baboo and produced by A Ganesh and Narayan J. The film stars V. Ravichandran, Prema, Rambha and Shruti in lead roles. The film had musical score by V. Ravichandran.

Plot
Vithala escapes on the day of his marriage and runs into the city. He faces various situations in the city and as a result, marries two other girls under pseudonyms - Pandu (innocent) and Ranga (Mechanic). In between, his villagers come to the city to find Vithal to bring back to the village. Vithal escapes from everyone by using his pseudonym characters. The rest of the story is about how he solves the situation.

Cast

V. Ravichandran as Vithala alias Pandu alias Ranga
Prema
Rambha
Shruti
Avinash
Tara
Mukhyamantri Chandru
Ramesh Bhat
Doddanna
Karibasavaiah
Bank Janardhan
Mandya Ramesh
 M. S. Umesh
Mandeep Roy
Sanjjanaa Galrani
Ashalatha
Padmini
Junglee Prasanna
Master Arun
Om Prakash Rao

Soundtrack
Music composed by V. Ravichandran and All the lyrics were written by V. Ravichandran.

References

External links
 

2005 films
2000s Kannada-language films
Films directed by Dinesh Baboo
Films scored by V. Ravichandran